Ockbrook is a village in Derbyshire, England. It is almost contiguous with the village of Borrowash, the two only separated by the A52. The civil parish is Ockbrook and Borrowash. The population of this civil parish at the 2011 Census was 7,335.

History
There is evidence of human activity in Ockbrook as far back as the Mesolithic period (~8000BC) in the form of two bifacial cores of flint. A small greenstone axe head attests to Neolithic activity (4000 - 2500BC, but no archaeological evidence has yet been discovered of Bronze Age activity in the village. From the Iron Age (800BC - AD43) there is a variety of evidence obtained during the excavation of a Romano-British aisled building at Littlehay Grange Farm between 1994 and 1997. This includes sherds of Ancaster Breedon scored ware and Aylesford-Swarling Pottery, a Group A one-piece brooch, an Iron Age coin of silver dating to between 40 BC and 10 AD, and an Iron Age ring headed pin or spike.

Evidence of occupation during the Roman period (AD43 - 410) includes the sites of three farmsteads, one of which has been excavated. From these it appears that the fortunes of the area at that time mirrored those of nearby Derventio (Roman Derby), with a boom starting during the 2nd century AD followed by abandonment at the end of the 4th century.
During the early Dark Ages, Ockbrook was part of the Kingdom of Mercia. According to the Anglo-Saxon Chronicle, this was founded in 560 by Creoda, one of whose followers may have had the personal name Occa. It was this Occa (an Anglo Saxon) who established Ockbrook in the 6th century on the banks of a small stream, the Ock.

During the ninth century, the Danes invaded and swept through large swathes of England until fought to a standstill by Alfred the Great. The country was partitioned as a consequence c874 and Ockbrook, being east of Watling Street (the present day A5) would have been in the Danelaw. This period is attested to by two place names, The Ridings and Carrhill, which derive from Danish. Despite frequent skirmishes between Danes and the English hereabouts, the Danelaw survived until 1066 when, according to the Domesday Book, the manor was held by Toki (probably a Dane). The entry reads:
"...In Ockbrook Tochi had four carucates of land (assessed) to the geld, land for four ploughs. There are now ten villeins and two Bordars having three ploughs and four rent paying tenants rendering 14 shillings. There are five acres of meadow, woodland for pannage one league in length and half a league wide. In King Edward’s day worth £4 now 40shillings belonging to the Bishop of Chester...".

By 1086 the manor had been transferred either to the extensive holdings of Geoffrey Alselin or to the Bishop of Chester (according to Domesday), both of whom were Norman. c1130 it was divided between two sons of Sir Ralph Halselin whence half descended to the Bardolfs of Wormegay (who sold it to the Foljambe's c1420) and half to Serlo de Grendon who granted it to Dale Abbey. At the Reformation, these shares were largely broken up amongst the freeholders, notably the Battelles, Harpurs, Keyes (of Hopwell) and Wilmots (of Chaddesden).

In 1750 the Moravian Church established a settlement here, one of only three remaining in the country. This was on the edge of the old village and separate from it. The buildings are Georgian red brick and two of them, the Manse (1822) and the chapel (1751–1752) are grade II listed. From the early 19th century, middle-class families from Derby and Long Eaton took advantage of the fragmented landowning pattern to acquire land and build elegant villas. Also during this period, work diversified to include four silk glove makers, four shoemakers, and a straw bonnet maker.
In more recent times, extensive new housing developments have turned Ockbrook into a commuter dormitory for Derby.

Sport

Cricket
History of cricket dates back to the mid nineteenth century, where a match report was recorded between Ockbrook and "Sawley Club" in 1843. Ockbrook & Borrowash Cricket Club moved to the current ground on Victoria Avenue in 1898. In 1999, Ockbrook & Borrowash CC became the first champions of the newly formed Premier Division of the Derbyshire County Cricket League; the top level for recreational club cricket in Derbyshire, England, and is a designated ECB Premier League. The club has continued to gain high acclaim and has since added a further 5 Championship ECB Premier league titles to its tally: 2005, 2006, 2009, 2011, and 2014.

Football
Ockbrook Football Club.

Golf
Borrowood Golf Club was founded in 1902 as a 9-hole course. It was laid out on farmland south of Borrow Wood Farm between the villages of Ockbrook and Spondon. The club closed in the early 1950s.

Area and population growth

The population growth figures include Borrowash Source: Email from Census Customer Services.

Schools
 Ockbrook Ridings Playgroup
 Redhill Primary School
 Ockbrook School

Churches

 All Saints' Church, Ockbrook became the parish church between c1550 and c1600. Prior to this it was a chapelry of Elvaston. The font is Saxon or Norman, the tower is late twelfth century, the broached spire is thirteenth century and the oak chancel screen dates from c1520. Recent historical research and archaeological finds suggest that it may originally have been a Pagan religious site.
 Moravian

Pubs
 Cross Keys. Still has a knitters window where stockings were made for Queen Victoria and her court.
 Queens Head.
 Royal Oak. Ockbrook's oldest pub, it was held by the Peet family for the three hundred years from ~1610 to 1912, a remarkable record. Beer was once brewed here, using water from the pub's own well, now capped by a stone slab near the front door.
 White Swan. Situated opposite All Saints church on Church Street.

Amenities
 Hill Top Service Station
 Eclipse Hairdressers
 The Apple Tree
 Village Hall

Streets, gitties and footpaths
This list of streets is taken from Street list from Streetmap.co.uk

 Anne Potter Close
 Bakehouse Lane
 Bare Lane – See note below
 Cedar Drive
 Church Street
 Cole Lane
 Collier Lane
 Collumbell Avenue
 Croft Close
 Far Lane: The ancient hedgerows along its upper reaches indicate that this is a very old track, probably dating from the Mesolithic. It is possible that it once connected with the Port-ways i.e. the rivers Derwent and Trent.
 Flood Street
 Green Lane – See note below
 Hargrave Avenue
 Hill Croft Drive

 Homefarm Close
 Moor Lane – See note below
 New Street
 Oak Close
 Orchard Close
 Pares Way
 Ryal Close
 Shop Stones
 Sisters Lane
 The Paddock
 The Ridings: The name is Danish either for a clearing or a similar-sounding word meaning a third division.
 The Settlement
 Top Manor Close
 Victoria Avenue
 Wesley Lane
 Windmill Close
 Yew Tree Avenue

 Note – Bare Lane, Green Lane and Moor Lane form one continuous road through the village.
The quickest route between two points in the village is often via a gitty. These were originally footpaths through fields. They have survived the encroachment of housing by mutating into high walled or fenced alleyways between the buildings and gardens of the new (and old) developments.
 
 
Numerous footpaths start at the village boundary (often as the continuation of a street or gitty) and lead over the fields to neighbouring villages, Hamlet_(place) and farms.

Historic maps (in chronological order)
 
 
 
 
 

 OS 25" Edition 1 1871–1882, Derbyshire sheet L sub-sheets 11, 12, 15, 16.
 OS 25" Edition 2 1896–1900, Derbyshire sheet L sub-sheets 11, 12, 15, 16.
 OS 6" County Series Edition 1 1887, Derbyshire sheet L SE.
 OS 6" County Series Edition 2 1901, Derbyshire sheet L SE.
 OS 6" County Series Edition 3 did not include Derbyshire.
 OS 25" Edition 3 1914–1925, Derbyshire sheet L sub-sheets 11, 12, 15, 16.
 OS 6" County Series Revision 1 1919, Derbyshire sheet L SE.
 OS 6" County Series Revision 2 1913 & 1938, Derbyshire sheet L SE.
 OS 25" Revision 1 1939–1947, Derbyshire sheet L sub-sheets 11, 12, 15, 16.
 OS 25" Revision 2 did not include Derbyshire.

OS = Ordnance Survey.
OS sheets use Roman numerals, so L = 50.

This list is incomplete.

See also
Listed buildings in Ockbrook and Borrowash

References

Further reading
 A French Parson at Ockbrook, Marion Johnson, M. Johnson, 31 October 2001, .
 A history of All Saints' Church, Ockbrook: including a brief account of the early origins of the village and parish, J W Harnan, J W Harnan, 1971, .
 Bold Shall I Stand: The Education of Young Women in the Moravian Settlement at Ockbrook Since 1799, James Muckle, Ockbrook School, September 1999, .
 History Of The Moravian Church, J. E. Hutton, R A Kessinger Publishing Co, 17 June 2004 .
 Lords of the Manor of Ockbrook: Archives 1583 to 1605 (Ockbrook & Borrowash Record S.), Marion Johnson, Greenway Publishing, 11 April 1994, .
 More Memories of Ockbrook and Borrowash (pamphlet), Marion Johnson, M. Johnson, 20 October 1991, .
 Ockbrook and Its Parson Samuel Hey 1810–52, Marion Johnson, M. Johnson, 1 March 1991, .
 Ockbrook in Old Picture Postcards, J. Lec Smith, Europese Bibliotheek B.V., Uitgeverij Boekhandel Antiquariaat, February 1985, .
 Ockbrook in the 1820s (pamphlet), Marion Johnson, M. Johnson, 31 July 1991, .
 The Plumpton Letters and Papers (Camden Fifth S.), Joan Kirby (Editor), Cambridge University Press, 16 January 1997, .
 Yeomen of Elizabethan Ockbrook: Archives of the Sixteenth Century (Ockbrook & Borrowash Record S.), Marion Johnson, Greenway Publishing, 11 April 1994, .

External links

 Ockbrook & Borrowash Community Information
 Ockbrook Football Club
 Ockash Trust
 A comprehensive photographic tour of Ockbrook
 Derbyshire UK – Ockbrook
 Discover Derbyshire and the Peak District – Ockbrook
 Ockbrook Parish Council
 Ockbrook School

Villages in Derbyshire
Civil parishes in Derbyshire
Borough of Erewash